The 2000–01 Ottawa Senators season was the ninth season of the Ottawa Senators of the National Hockey League (NHL). This season saw the Senators place first in the Northeast Division, with 109 points. The Senators made the playoffs for the fifth consecutive season but they were upset in the Eastern Conference Quarterfinals by the Toronto Maple Leafs, being swept in four games with losses of 1-0 (in overtime), 2-0, 3-2 (in overtime), and 3-1. The Senators did not score a single goal in either of their two playoff games in Ottawa.

Regular season
Ottawa trailed only the Pittsburgh Penguins and New Jersey Devils with the most goals during the regular season (274).

Alexei Yashin played during the 2000–01 season, but was not restored as captain; the position remaining with Alfredsson. After the season, Yashin would be traded to the New York Islanders for Zdeno Chara, Bill Muckalt, and the Isles' first round draft pick (second overall), which the Sens used to draft Jason Spezza. Yashin would sign a ten-year contract with the Isles.

On Saturday, November 18, the Senators scored three short-handed goals in a 5–2 home win against the Florida Panthers.

Final standings

Playoffs

Eastern Conference Quarterfinals

Toronto wins series 4-0

Schedule and results

Awards and records
 Molson Cup – Patrick Lalime

Player statistics

Regular season
Scoring

Goaltending

Playoffs
Scoring

Goaltending

Transactions

Trades

Waivers

Expansion draft

Source:

Draft picks

Ottawa's draft picks from the 2000 NHL Entry Draft held on June 24 and June 25, 2000 at the Saddledome in Calgary, Alberta.

Farm teams
 Grand Rapids Griffins (International Hockey League)
 Mobile Mysticks (East Coast Hockey League)

See also
 2000–01 NHL season

References

Ottawa Senators seasons
Ottawa Senators season
Ottawa